Joypurhat-1 is a constituency represented in the Jatiya Sangsad (National Parliament) of Bangladesh since 2014 by Shamsul Alam Dudu of the Awami League.

Boundaries 
The constituency encompasses Joypurhat Sadar and Panchbibi  upazilas.

History 
The constituency was created in 1982 from a Bogra constituency when the former Bogra District was split into two districts: Bogra and Joypurhat.

Members of Parliament

Elections

Elections in the 2010s 
Shamsul Alam Dudu was elected unopposed in the 2014 general election after opposition parties withdrew their candidacies in a boycott of the election.

Elections in the 2000s

Elections in the 1990s

References

External links
 

Parliamentary constituencies in Bangladesh
Joypurhat District